Pesäpallo, the Finnish variant of baseball, was played as a demonstration sport at the 1952 Summer Olympics at Helsinki Olympic Stadium in Helsinki, Finland.

The ceremonial first feed, or pitch, was thrown at 18:00 on 31 July by Lauri Pihkala, who had created the sport.  The teams playing were the Finnish Baseball Federation and the Finnish Workers' Sports Federation.  In a match with a shortened schedule, the Finnish Baseball Federation won, 8–4.

Rosters

Finnish Baseball League (Pesäpalloliitto)
 Eino Kaakkolahti, pitcher
 Leo Hannula, 1st baseman
 Viljo Niemi, left fielder
 Olli Hanski, 2nd baseman
 Antti Elomaa, catcher
 Pertti Ahonen, 3rd baseman
 Eero Vuorio, right shortstop
 Toivo Ilola, left shortstop
 Taisto Lehto, right fielder
 Viljo Kokkonen, substitute
 Pertti Jaakkola, substitute
 Eero Vilevaara, substitute

Worker's Athletic Federation (Työväen Urheiluliitto)
 Aimo Paavola, pitcher
 Osmo Juntto, 1st baseman
 Onni Sallinen, left fielder
 Jorma Harlin, 2nd baseman
 Reino Hakkarainen, catcher
 Veikko Auersalmi, 3rd baseman
 Pauli Kilpiä, right shortstop
 Paavo Reiju, left shortstop
 Lasse Heikkilä, right fielder
 Pauli Lahtinen, substitute
 Pauli Vainio, substitute
 Oiva Huuskonen, substitute

Sources
 
 Official Report. XV Olympiad Helsinki 1952.

References

1952 Summer Olympics events
1952
1952 in baseball
1952 Summer Olympics
1952
Discontinued sports at the Summer Olympics
Olympic demonstration sports
Men's events at the 1952 Summer Olympics